Cefquinome is a fourth-generation cephalosporin with pharmacological and antibacterial properties valuable in the treatment of coliform mastitis and other infections. It is only used in veterinary applications.

Properties 
Cefquinome is resistant to beta-lactamase. Chemically, its zwitterionic structure can facilitate rapid penetration across biological membranes, including porins of bacterial cell walls. Plus, it has a higher affinity to target penicillin-binding proteins. The reactive site is a beta-lactam nucleus, while the main peripheral functional groups are a quaternary quinolinium, an aminothiazolyl moiety and an unusual O-alkylated oxime.

Cefquinome acts by inhibition of the cell wall synthesis, but it has a relatively short half-life of about 2.5 hours. It is less than 5% protein bound and is excreted unchanged in the urine.

Studies 

Many studies have been conducted, mostly for animal use.  One such study was conducted by the Pharma Research in Germany.

Test groups 
Groups of albino mice, weighing 191 g, were dosed with 10 and 40 mg of cefquinome per kg. Blood samples were obtained from a cut at the tip of the tail and kept at 4°C. Urine was collected in metabolism cages.

Three male beagle dogs, weighing about 22 kg each, were dosed with 5, 10, and 20 mg/kg at the cephalic vein. Blood samples were drawn from the same vein in the opposite leg. Meanwhile, urine was collected by catheterization.

Pigs, five or six male and female in each group weighing about 18 kg each, were injected with 10 mg of cefquinome at the vena jugularis in the base of the left ear.  Blood samples were withdrawn from the contralateral jugular vein.

Male and female calves  weighing between 110 and 140 kg were dosed with 10 mg of cefquinome per kg through the vena jugularis.

Standard solutions were prepared from pooled murine blood and urine taken from untreated dogs, pigs, and calves.

Calculations 
Cefquinome concentrations were calculated by regression analysis, using the standard curves in which logarithms of the concentration were proportional to the areas of the inhibition zones.  Curve fitting was carried out by nonlinear regression with the computer program PHAKOK.  Pharmacokinetic analysis of the concentration-time data after administration indicated that the best curve fits were usually achieved by using an open two-compartment model.

Conclusion 
Data indicate that cefquinome has high antibacterial activity in vitro against nearly all strains tested.  In general, cefquinome is within the same range as cefpirome and cefotaxime.  Against Gram-negative species, cefquinome has very limited in vitro activity.  The in vitro activity of cefquinome does not depend on the composition or pH of the test medium.  The broad antibacterial spectrum and the high in vitro activity are reflected by high in vivo efficacy in experimental infections.  In mouse models of septicaemia, cefquinome possessed high therapeutic efficacy.  All infections were cured.

Intervet 
Intervet developed cefquinome (Cobactan) to treat bovine respiratory disease, the most common disease in cattle.  An injection, containing 25 mg cefquinome per ml, is given to cattle and pigs.

Treatment 
In cattle, the injection should help against respiratory disease caused by Mannheimia haemolytica and Pasteurella multocida.  It also helps with acute E. coli mastitis, dermatitis, infectious bulbar necrosis, and interdigital necrobacillosis.  In calves, it is effective against E. coli septicaemia.

For pigs, it is used to treat bacterial infections of the lungs and respiratory tract caused by P. multocida, Haemophilus parasuis, Actinobacillus pleuropneumoniae, and Streptococcus suis.  Mastitis-metritis-agalactia syndrome involved with E. coli, Staphylococcus, Streptococcus, and other cefquinome-sensitive organisms are also treated.  In piglets, the mortality rate in cases of meningitis caused by Streptococcus suis is reduced.  It is used in the treatment of mild or moderate lesions caused by Staphylococcus hyicus and arthritis caused by Streptococcus spp. and E. coli.

Caution/warnings 
These are some factors to be aware of before treating:
 This product should not be used in animals known to be hypersensitive to β-lactam antibiotics.
 It should not be administered to animals with a body weight less than 1.25 kg.
 Use of the product may result in localised tissue reaction.   Tissue lesions are repaired by 15 days after the last administration of the product.
 Hypersensitivity reactions to cephalosporins occur rarely.
 The product does not contain an antimicrobial preservative.
 To prevent the claimed infections in piglets, attention should be paid to hygiene and ventilation, and overcrowding should be avoided.   When the first piglets are affected, careful examination of all animals in the same pen is recommended to enable an early treatment of any other infected piglets.

Clinical usage

Human use 
Cefquinome is not approved for human use.

Veterinary medicine 
Conditions of use are limited to therapeutic, parenteral, and individual animal use. Individual parenteral therapy of bovine respiratory disease data on cefquinome-related residues demonstrate  only very small amounts are present in the intestinal tract of treated cattle with gastrointestinal activation. However, treatment should be short, meaning a single injection daily for about a week. Treatment should only be given by prescription. Cefquinome should not be used in feed or water.

Since 1994, in Europe, it was allowed to treat cattle by prescription only. In 1999, swine were included. By 2005, horses were allowed as well. In the United States, approval is pending for treatment of bovine respiratory disease. Even so, this is only available by prescription.

Cefquinome is also used for other illnesses, such as “shipping fever”, a pneumonia-like illness commonly found in cattle.

Concerns

Resistance and food-borne transmission 
Of concern, the use of the drug in animals may lead to increases in antibiotic resistance. Humans can be exposed to bacteria through food-borne transmission, raising chances of becoming exposed to resistant bacterial species, such as Salmonella or E. coli. The potential for the development of antibiotic resistance increases as usage increases, by selecting bacteria which have acquired beta-lactamases.

Salmonella 
The use may cause resistance in Salmonella present in the intestinal tract of the target animal. Resistant Salmonella may also contaminate the carcass at slaughter and transfer to humans when used as food.  When humans are infected and treated with a fourth-generation cephalosporin, effectiveness may be compromised.

Although fourth-generation cephalosporin resistance is very rare, they are active against bacteria carrying the AmpC-type β-lactamase resistance mechanism. Since the late 1990s, the US and EU have surveyed and gathered data for fourth-generation cephalosporins for both human and veterinary use. Data indicate no changes occur in resistance patterns of relevant food-borne pathogens.

FDA guidelines 
 Administered products will be used in individual animals for short duration and by prescription only.
 The extent of use is ranked low.
 Avoid human drug resistance to fourth-generation cephalosporins by authorizing extra-label prohibition.

Synthesis 
Broad-spectrum fourth generation injectable aminothiazolyl cephalosporin.

Cefotaxime (1) is a potent cephalosporin antibiotic in its own right. Further modification of this drug by inclusion of a quaternary ammonium cation gives a compound suitable for parenteral administration by increasing water solubility. The acid in cefotaxime is first protected as its silyl ester (2) by derivatization with N-methyl-N-(trimethylsilyl)trifluoroacetamide (MSTFA). Treatment of this intermediate with trimethylsilyl iodide gives the allylic iodide (3). Displacement of halogen with 5,6,7,8-tetrahydroquinoline (2,3-cyclohexenopyridine) gives the corresponding quaternary salt. Hydrolysis of the silyl ester followed by adjustments of the pH leads to the betaine cefquinome (4).

See also 
 Campylobacter
 Cefepime
 Cephalosporin
 Enterococcus
 Zwitterion

References

Further reading

External links 
 

Cephalosporin antibiotics
Quinolines
Thiazoles
Ketoximes